Fredy Alejandro Guarín Vásquez (born 30 June 1986) is a Colombian former professional footballer. A versatile player, he was comfortable as a central, defensive or right midfielder.

He started his career with Envigado, then had a short spell in Argentina, and played two years in France with Saint-Étienne. He made a name for himself with Porto in Portugal, where he spent four seasons and won ten major titles, including three Primeira Liga championships and the 2011 Europa League.

Guarín represented Colombia at the 2011 Copa América and the 2014 World Cup.

Club career

Early years and Saint-Étienne
Guarín was born in Puerto Boyacá. In 2005, already a regular for Envigado F.C. and the Colombian under-20 national team, he joined Boca Juniors of the Argentine Primera División, where he spent the first six months in the youth team. Upon completion of his loan the Buenos Aires-based club attempted to sign him on a permanent basis, but he instead chose to go on loan to AS Saint-Étienne in August 2006.

Guarín made his debut for the French side scoring twice in a friendly against RCD Espanyol, and gradually fought his way into the starting lineup as the season closed. He first appeared in the Ligue 1 on 14 October 2006 against Olympique Lyonnais, and scored his first goal in a 3–1 victory over Troyes AC. In April 2007, the deal was made permanent for four years.

Porto

On 10 July 2008, Guarín agreed a four-year contract with Primeira Liga club FC Porto for an undisclosed fee. Portuguese under-21 international Paulo Machado went the opposite direction, on loan. During his spell he was used mainly as a substitute, but managed to appear regularly; arguably, his most important goal came on 16 May 2010 as the team renewed their Taça de Portugal title, defeating G.D. Chaves 2–1.

In 2010–11, even after the departure of Raul Meireles to Liverpool, Guarín initially struggled to make Porto's starting XI. He was, however, a very important midfield element for the eventual national champions, playing in more than 40 official games and scoring ten goals, including five in the Europa League campaign, which also ended in conquest.

Inter Milan

Guarín joined Inter Milan on 31 January 2012 for €1.5 million, on loan, with the player replacing Paris Saint-Germain FC-bound Thiago Motta. The Italians also had an option to make the move permanent for €13.5 million in June.

On 17 May 2012, a permanent deal was arranged, but for €11 million. Guarín scored his first official goal for the Nerazzurri on 30 August, in a 2–2 home draw against FC Vaslui in the Europa League (4–2 on aggregate). In the group stage of the same competition, he provided all three assists in a 3–1 defeat of Neftchi Baku PFC.

Again in the Europa League, on 21 February 2013, Guarín scored twice in a 3–0 away win over CFR Cluj (5–0 on aggregate) to help Inter make it through to the last 16. In the January 2014 transfer window, he was supposed to move to Juventus F.C. in exchange for Mirko Vučinić, but the deal ultimately fell through after the clubs could not reach an agreement. He declared he would not return if he was not allowed to leave, but eventually he reconsidered; it was later reported that he simply wanted to clarify his future with the club, stating that he never asked to leave and that he was confused as to why the situation was created.

On 25 March 2014, Guarín agreed to extend his contract until 2017. On 14 September, as a second-half replacement, he scored in a 7–0 home win against U.S. Sassuolo Calcio. At the start of the 2014–15 season, he began being used by manager Walter Mazzarri as a second striker.

On 7 December 2014, in his 100th appearance for Inter, Guarín assisted Mauro Icardi in the 44th minute of an eventual 1–2 home defeat to Udinese Calcio. On 16 February of the following year, he scored twice after winning a first-minute penalty kick in a 4–1 victory at Atalanta BC, helping his team to secure the first away win in the league since December 2014.

Later career
On 26 January 2016, Guarín joined Shanghai Greenland Shenhua F.C. in the Chinese Super League for a reported €11 million fee plus bonuses. On 26 September 2019, the 33-year-old free agent moved to the Campeonato Brasileiro Série A with CR Vasco da Gama. 

Guarín agreed to a one-year deal at Millonarios F.C. on 31 December 2020, again on a free transfer.

International career

On 24 May 2006, Guarín made his international debut for Colombia, in a pre-World Cup friendly against Ecuador. He represented the nation at the 2005 CONCACAF Gold Cup and the 2011 Copa América.

Guarín was selected by José Pekerman for his 2014 World Cup squad. He played his first game in the tournament on 24 June after the national team had already won its first two group matches, featuring the full 90 minutes in a 4–1 win against Japan which was also his 49th cap; he earned his 50th four days later, coming on as a late substitute to help oust Uruguay 2–0 in the round of 16.

On 10 May 2015, whilst at the service of Inter, Guarín suffered a muscular injury to his right leg, being ruled out of the Copa América.

Style of play
A versatile player, Guarín is a strong, fast and creative attacking midfielder, who can also play in the centre, in a holding role or on the right flank. He is capable of shooting from long-range with both feet, and of acting as a playmaker in midfield. 

In 2013, Guarín's Inter manager Andrea Stramaccioni described him as "...an extraordinary player who combines physicality with technique in an incredible way. He is also an important element in the locker room."

Career statistics

Club

International

International goals
Scores and results list Colombia's goal tally first, score column indicates score after each Guarín goal.

Honours
Porto
Primeira Liga: 2008–09, 2010–11, 2011–12
Taça de Portugal: 2008–09, 2009–10, 2010–11
Supertaça Cândido de Oliveira: 2009, 2010, 2011
UEFA Europa League: 2010–11
Taça da Liga runner-up: 2009–10
UEFA Super Cup runner-up: 2011

Shanghai Shenhua
Chinese FA Cup: 2017

Notes

References

External links

1986 births
Living people
Colombian people of African descent
Sportspeople from Boyacá Department
Colombian footballers
Association football midfielders
Categoría Primera A players
Atlético Huila footballers
Envigado F.C. players
Millonarios F.C. players
Argentine Primera División players
Boca Juniors footballers
Ligue 1 players
AS Saint-Étienne players
Primeira Liga players
FC Porto players
Serie A players
Inter Milan players
Chinese Super League players
Shanghai Shenhua F.C. players
Campeonato Brasileiro Série A players
CR Vasco da Gama players
UEFA Europa League winning players
Colombia youth international footballers
Colombia under-20 international footballers
Colombia international footballers
2005 CONCACAF Gold Cup players
2011 Copa América players
2014 FIFA World Cup players
Colombian expatriate footballers
Expatriate footballers in Argentina
Expatriate footballers in France
Expatriate footballers in Portugal
Expatriate footballers in Italy
Expatriate footballers in China
Expatriate footballers in Brazil
Colombian expatriate sportspeople in Argentina
Colombian expatriate sportspeople in France
Colombian expatriate sportspeople in Portugal
Colombian expatriate sportspeople in Italy
Colombian expatriate sportspeople in China
Colombian expatriate sportspeople in Brazil